Felli is a village and a community of the Grevena municipality. Before the 2011 local government reform, it was a part of the municipality of Grevena, of which it was a municipal district. The 2011 census recorded 1,035 residents in the village and 1,094 residents in the community. The community of Felli covers an area of 57.857 km2.

Administrative division
The community of Felli consists of two separate settlements: 
Eleftherochori (population 59)
Felli (population 1,035)
The aforementioned population figures are as of 2011.

Population
According to the 2011 census, the population of the settlement of Felli was 1,035 people, an increase of almost 285% compared to the previous census of 2001. This increase is due to the opening of a prison in 2008, having a capacity of 600 prisoners.

See also
 List of settlements in the Grevena regional unit

References

Populated places in Grevena (regional unit)
Villages in Greece